The WABA Champions Cup 2000 was the 3rd staging of the WABA Champions Cup, the basketball club tournament of West Asia Basketball Association. The tournament was held in Damascus, Syria between May 2 and May 4. The winner qualify for the 2000 ABC Champions Cup.

Standings

References
WABA Champions Cup - Roll of Honor 

2000
International basketball competitions hosted by Syria
1999–2000 in Asian basketball
1999–2000 in Jordanian basketball
1999–2000 in Iranian basketball
2000 in Syrian sport